Pierre Chatenet (6 March 1917 in Paris – 4 September 1997 in Tafers) was a French politician. He served as French Interior Minister from 1959 to 1961. From 1962 he became the last president of the Commission of the European Atomic Energy Community, until the body was merged with the European Economic Community in 1967. (See Chatenet Commission)

1917 births
1997 deaths
Politicians from Paris
French European Commissioners
French interior ministers
Lycée Buffon alumni
Sciences Po alumni
Commandeurs of the Légion d'honneur
Grand Crosses of the Order of the Crown (Belgium)